WAPB (91.7 FM) is a radio station licensed to Madison, Florida, USA. The station is currently owned by Public Radio, Inc.

References

External links
 
 
 

APB